12 Inches of Sin is an annual international juried exhibition of erotic art in Las Vegas. Founded in 2010, it explores human identity, sexuality, gender, and artistic expression. Accepted works include paintings, photographs, digital art, sculpture, illustration, mixed media and short films, but each work must not be larger than 12 inches in any direction (or one foot square). An expert jury of 12 judges chooses 36 artists from submissions. Artists from 26 countries have participated to date.

History

12 Inches of Sin was founded in 2010 by the sexologist and gallerist Laura Henkel in her Sin City Gallery. Her goal was to provide sex education opportunities for learning through the visual arts. 12 Inches of Sin was conceived to move beyond the idea of produced sexuality and offer an alternative, inclusive and meaningfully personalized view of human identity, sexuality, gender, and expression.

With its call for entries judged by a panel of international experts of the field, the show brought artists from all over the world into the Las Vegas Arts District, beginning with 40 submissions of art from five countries in its first year and growing to 300 submissions from 26 countries in its seventh year. As art submissions grew, exhibition categories were created to support traditional and new media artists. They have been curated by Henkel.

In 2016, the event expanded with Immersive, a multi-media art event, featuring international performance artists known for their erotic and provocative work, as well as demonstrations such as shibari. Sin City Gallery was listed among the Best 25 Art Galleries in America by the American Art Awards and was awarded the prize of Best Gallery in Nevada.

The juried exhibition

All work submitted must follow a strict rule of being no larger than 12 inches in any direction, for a total of one foot square. Thematically, the work of art must explore eroticism and sensuality. Works by artists new and established around the world are selected for being "sophisticated, intelligent, witty and provocative."

The juried art exhibition includes three categories:

12 Inches of Sin exhibition embraces painting, collage, sculpture, drawings and mixed media made by hand. A panel of twelve judges invites 12 artists to exhibit, as well as name the Best in Show awardee, who is featured in an exclusive exhibition curated by Sin City Gallery.

Obscura embraces photography, digital, video and all new technologies. A panel of twelve judges invites 12 artists to exhibit, as well as name the Best in Show awardee, who is featured in an exclusive exhibition curated by Sin City Gallery.

Le Salon des Refusés du Péché provides a curated selection of meritorious works from the art submissions. It embraces all mediums and includes exhibits of 12 Inches of Sin and Obscura invited artists.

The annual call for art is July through August. The exhibition and festivities continues to expand. A portion of proceeds from the event are donated to the charitable organization Sin Sity Sisters of Perpetual Indulgence. The exhibition is open to visitors over 21 years of age.

Winners

The following are the Best in Show winners:

References

External links
12 Inches of Sin
Holy Order Sin Sity Sisters of Perpetual Indulgence
Sin City Gallery 

Art exhibitions in the United States
Erotic art
Culture of Las Vegas